Choctaw Creek may refer to:

Choctaw Creek (Claiborne County, Mississippi), a tributary to Bayou Pierre in Mississippi
Choctaw Creek (Copiah County, Mississippi), a tributary to Bayou Pierre in Mississippi
Choctaw Creek (Harrison County, Mississippi)
Choctaw Creek (Jefferson Davis County, Mississippi)